Lawrence Bernard Brown (September 12, 1856 – June 16, 1941) was a self-made businessman, community leader, and master carpenter.

Biography
Brown was born in Wacahoota, Florida the sixth of seven children by Peter (a "plantation minister") and Catherine Brown. Brown along with the rest of his family lived as enslaved peoples until slavery was abolished by the Thirteenth Amendment in 1865.

He died in Bartow, Florida in 1941.

See also
 Lawrence Brown House

References

External links
 

1856 births
1941 deaths
People from Alachua County, Florida